Wells Creek is a  tributary of the Mississippi River in Wabasha and Goodhue counties in Minnesota, United States.  It enters the Mississippi at Old Frontenac.

Wells Creek was named for James "Bully" Wells, an early settler.

See also
List of rivers of Minnesota

References

External links
Minnesota Watersheds
USGS Hydrologic Unit Map - State of Minnesota (1974)

Rivers of Minnesota
Tributaries of the Mississippi River
Rivers of Wabasha County, Minnesota
Rivers of Goodhue County, Minnesota